"Dream Baby Dream" is a song by the electro-punk band Suicide, written by its members Martin Rev and Alan Vega. It was released as a single in 1979 by Island Records. It has been covered by Neneh Cherry and The Thing on the 2011-recorded album The Cherry Thing and by Bruce Springsteen both live and in a studio version released on High Hopes (2014). Springsteen released a live version as an EP which was a part of the Alan Vega 70th Birthday Limited Edition EP Series in 2008. Also part of the EP series was a live version of "Dream Baby Dream" performed by Suicide on NBC's The Midnight Special in 1978.

The song appeared in Adam Curtis' 2016 BBC documentary HyperNormalisation during a montage featuring skyscrapers being blown up.

Accolades 

(*) designates unordered lists.

Formats and track listing 
All songs written by Martin Rev and Alan Vega
UK 7" single (WIP 6543)
"Dream Baby Dream" – 6:19
"Radiation" – 3:03

Personnel
Adapted from the Dream Baby Dream liner notes.

Suicide
 Martin Rev – keyboards
 Alan Vega – vocals

Production and additional personnel
 Ric Ocasek – production
 Jay Burnett – engineering

Release history

References

External links 
 

1979 songs
1979 singles
1981 singles
Suicide (band) songs
Island Records singles
Songs written by Martin Rev
Songs written by Alan Vega
Song recordings produced by Ric Ocasek
Bruce Springsteen songs